Superorganism is an album by the Mickey Hart Band, a musical group led by former Grateful Dead drummer Mickey Hart.  It was released by 360° Productions on August 13, 2013.

On Superorganism, musicians singing and playing instruments such as guitar, bass, keyboards, and various drums combined their music with sounds created using Hart's own brain waves.  The brain wave sounds were created by using computers to change electrical impulses from an EEG cap into audible frequencies.

The lyrics for four of the songs were written by Robert Hunter, who wrote the words for many Grateful Dead songs.

In the album liner notes, Hart wrote, "A superorganism is a complex organism composed of many smaller organisms.... A band is a superorganism, so is the universe. For the last few years I have been creating music from the source sounds of the cosmos and now the body. These sounds are noise — harsh, strange — and it is only after dancing with their essence face to face that music can be created."

Track listing
"Falling Stars" (Mickey Hart, Ben Yonas, Crystal Monee Hall, Dave Schools, Robert Hunter) – 6:01
"The Sermon" (Hart, Yonas, Schools, Andre Pessis, Hunter) – 4:42
"Chabadas" (Hart, Yonas, Hall, Schools, Pessis, Zakir Hussain, Hunter) – 6:16
"Don't Let Your God Down" (Hart, Yonas, Hall, Pessis, Cliff Goldmacher, Giovanni Hidalgo, Hussain, Reya Hart) – 6:14
"I Want It Back" (Hart, Yonas, Pessis, Hidalgo, Hussain) – 8:15
"Aliromba O Saro" (Hart, Yonas, Jonah Sharp, Pessis, Hussain, Hunter) – 5:55
"Rage On" (Hart, Yonas, Hall, Schools, Hidalgo) – 5:44
"Mind Your Head" (Hart, Yonas, Hall, Sharp, Sikiru Adepoju, Hidalgo, Hussain) – 5:57
"Bully Boy" (Hart, Yonas, Hall, Schools, Hidalgo) – 4:38
"Ghost Rider" (Hart, Yonas, Hall, Sharp, Adepoju, Hidalgo) – 6:48

Personnel

Musicians
Mickey Hart – drums, percussion, vocals, brain waves
Sikiru Adepoju – percussion
Joe Bagale – guitar, keyboards, vocals
Crystal Monee Hall – vocals
Ian "Inkx" Herman – drums
Giovanni Hidalgo – percussion
Zakir Hussain – percussion
Chris Kelley – vocals
Steve Kimock – guitar
Gawain Mathews – guitar
Reed Mathis – bass
Dave Schools – bass
Jonah Sharp – keyboards
Greg Shutte – drums
Adam Theis – bass
African Showboyz – additional percussion

Production
Produced by Mickey Hart, Ben Yonas
Recording engineer: Ben Yonas
Assistant engineers: Alex McGraw, Noa Yonas
Additional engineering: John Paul McClean
Mastering: Brad Blackwood
Musicology consultant: Fredric Lieberman
Graphic design: Malea Clark-Nicholson
Lettering: Roxanne Smith
Photography: John Werner

References

Mickey Hart albums
2013 albums
Albums produced by Mickey Hart